San Juan del Río Municipality may refer to:
 San Juan del Río Municipality, Durango
 San Juan del Río Municipality, Querétaro

Municipality name disambiguation pages